Hope Springs is a 2012 American romantic comedy-drama film directed by David Frankel, written by Vanessa Taylor, and starring Meryl Streep, Tommy Lee Jones, and Steve Carell. The film was released on August 10, 2012. It received generally positive reviews, and the cast was praised for their performances. It was nominated for a Golden Globe and won a People's Choice Award.

Plot
Although a devoted couple, empty nesters Kay and Arnold Soames are in need of help to reignite the spark in their marriage. Married for thirty-one years, they have slept in separate bedrooms for various pragmatic reasons since their youngest child went off to college, and forgo any physical affection. One day Kay (who works as a Coldwater Creek employee) tells Arnold (a partner in an Omaha accounting firm) she has paid for them to undergo a week of intense marriage counseling with Dr. Bernie Feld in a coastal resort town in Maine. Arnold, a creature of plodding, unimaginative routine, denies their marriage is in trouble.

In sessions with Dr. Feld, a psychiatrist, they try to articulate their feelings, revitalize their relationship, and find the spark that caused them to fall in love in the first place. Dr. Feld counsels them, asking increasingly frank questions about their sex life and feelings. Being private and old-fashioned, Arnold is angry and defensive, unwilling to see the depth of his wife's disappointment. Angry and crying, Kay goes alone to a bar where she has several glasses of wine, confides in the female bartender and learns that few others are having any sex, either. Arnold visits a nautical museum.

Back together, they spend the night in the same bed for the first time in years, and Kay awakes to find Arnold's arm around her. At this sign of progress, Dr. Feld urges new measures. They make halting attempts at intimacy on the bed of their budget motel and again in a movie theater, but this time with disastrous results.

In a one-on-one session, Dr. Feld explains to Arnold that couples seeking marriage counseling are doing so for a reason, and asks Arnold frankly, "Is this the best you can do?"  Arnold finally takes the initiative to arrange a romantic dinner and a night at a luxury inn, where they attempt to make love in front of a fireplace, but the grand gesture ultimately fails. At their final session, Dr. Feld tells them they've made much progress and should take up couples therapy back home.

Back in Omaha, old habits resume. Kay offers to pet-sit for a fellow employee and packs a bag to stay there, as a first step in a permanent break with Arnold. That night, both are shown in bed trying to sleep. Arnold enters Kay's bedroom and they tenderly embrace. The lovemaking that follows is warm, natural, and quietly passionate. The next morning it's clear that the marriage has shifted into an improved direction. Later that year, as Kay said she fantasized, they renew their wedding vows on a beach with Dr. Feld and their grown children present, making promises to be more understanding and considerate of each other.

Cast
 Meryl Streep as Kay Soames
 Tommy Lee Jones as Arnold Soames
 Steve Carell as Dr. Bernard 'Bernie' Feld
 Elisabeth Shue as Karen
 Jean Smart as Eileen
 Brett Rice as Vince
 Mimi Rogers as Carol
 Ben Rappaport as Brad
 Marin Ireland as Molly
 Patch Darragh as Mark
 Becky Ann Baker as Cora
 Lee Cunningham as Lee, the unhappy wife

Production
The project was first announced in 2010 with Streep and Jeff Bridges in talks for the leads and Mike Nichols attached as director. Bridges soon dropped out, and James Gandolfini and Philip Seymour Hoffman were soon attached to the project.

The project then replaced Nichols with David Frankel, without the involvement of Gandolfini and Hoffman. Steve Carell joined the cast in February 2011, with Tommy Lee Jones replacing Bridges in the opposite lead.

Filming took place in September and October 2011 in Connecticut.

Reception
Reviews were mostly positive, with critics praising the cast, particularly Streep, Jones, and Carell. 
Metacritic, which assigns a weighted mean rating to reviews from mainstream critics, gives the film a score of 65 out of 100, based on reviews from 36 critics, indicating "generally positive reviews". 
Review aggregation website Rotten Tomatoes gives an approval rating of 75% based on reviews from 174 critics, with an average score of 6.60/10. The site's consensus states: "Led by a pair of mesmerizing performances from Meryl Streep and Tommy Lee Jones, Hope Springs offers filmgoers some grown-up laughs -- and a thoughtful look at mature relationships."

Rex Reed of The New York Observer praised the film:

I think everything about the movie is too subtle and real to appeal to the Batman demographic, but for mature audiences who have forgotten how to smile, it takes up where The Best Exotic Marigold Hotel left off.

Angie Errigo of Empire magazine felt the film worked on multiple levels:

Very funny, it's also penetrating on the ravages of time on love and marriage and sweetly touching, but with abundantly incongruous randy content to heartily amuse.

Roger Ebert of the Chicago Sun-Times praised the performance of Jones:

The reason to see it is for Jones. This man who can stride fearlessly through roles requiring strong, determined men, this actor who can seem in complete control, finds a character here who seems unlike any other he has played and plays it bravely.

Accolades

Home media
Hope Springs was released on DVD and Blu-ray Disc on December 4, 2012.

References

External links
 
 
 
 
 
 

2012 films
2012 romantic comedy-drama films
2010s English-language films
American romantic comedy-drama films
Columbia Pictures films
Films about marriage
Films about sexuality
Films directed by David Frankel
Films scored by Theodore Shapiro
Films set in Maine
Films set in Nebraska
Films shot in Connecticut
Films with screenplays by Vanessa Taylor
Escape Artists films
Mandate Pictures films
Metro-Goldwyn-Mayer films
Midlife crisis films
2010s American films